Earthworm Heart is the second full-length album recorded by Cape Breton indie rock band Tom Fun Orchestra  It was recorded over a period of a few years at Soundpark Studios in Sydney, Nova Scotia. It was produced by Jamie Foulds and the band, engineered by Foulds and Bert Lionais, and mixed and mastered by Foulds.

Track listing

1.Merry Christmas Jim - 5:08
2.Rowing Away - 3:31
3.I Am Bleeding Hallelujah - 3:58
4.Dear Eleanor - 2:59
5.Lungs - 3:43
6.Concussional - 0:53
7.Anchors Aweigh - 4:27
8.Earthworm Heart - 2:36
9.Animal Mask - 4:17
10.Winter Spring - 2:04
11.Boxcar Lullaby - 3:59
12.Sunshine on my Bones - 4:26
13.Ulysses - 3:11
14.Sympathetic Wolf - 6:48

Personnel

Tom Fun Orchestra 

Albert Lionais - Trumpet, Coronet, Vocals
Breagh Potter - Vocals, Acoustic Guitar
Dave Mahalik - Accordion
Ian MacDougall - Lead Vocals, Electric & Acoustic Guitar
Shane O'Handley - Bass guitar, Electric Autoharp, Vocals
Steve Wilton - Drums
Victor Tomiczek - Banjo, Electric Guitar, Vocals

Featuring 

Colin Grant - Violin, String Arrangements
Carmen Townsend - Vocals
Nathan Richards - Electric, Acoustic, and Slide Guitars
Thomas Allen - Drums, Percussion
Zachary MacLean - Electric Guitar, Piano
Jamie Foulds - Synths, Electric Guitar

The Flying Horse Singers 

Alyce MacLean, Alex Abbass, Alex Sheppard,
AJ Fraser, Andrew Grieg, Andrew Lionais, Ashley MacIntyre,
Corey MacMullin, Dinao MacCormick, Harry Doyle, James Walsh
Jenni Welsh, John Gill, Katie Boutllier, Katie LeBlanc, Maria Nemis, 
Mike LeLievre, Redmond MacDougall, Stephen MacDougall, 
Steven Fifield, Thomas Allen, Tori MacKinnon

Production 

Jamie Foulds - Producer, Engineering, Mixing, Mastering
Albert Lionais - Engineering
Tom Fun Orchestra - Producer

References 

 http://www.popmatters.com/review/169098-the-tom-fun-orchestra-earthworm-heart/
 http://grayowlpoint.com/2012/12/13/review-earthworm-heart-the-tom-fun-orchestra/
 https://archive.today/20131228031451/http://www.americana-uk.com/cd-reviews/item/the-tom-fun-orchestra
 https://archive.today/20131228031419/http://www.substructnews.com/2012/12/22/the-tom-fun-orchestras-earthworm-heart/

2012 albums
Tom Fun Orchestra albums